A steam machine is a heat engine that performs mechanical work using steam as its working fluid.

Steam machine may also refer to:
Steam cannon, a cannon that launches a projectile using only heat and water
Steam cleaning, the cleaning process using steam

Computing
Steam Machine (hardware platform), a pre-built gaming computer designed to operate using SteamOS
Heron: Steam Machine, a puzzle video game by Triangle Studios

Music and literature
"Steam Machine", a single by Daft Punk from the album Human After All
"Steam Machine", a song by Freur from the album Doot-Doot
"Steam Machine", a song by Eric Prydz
"Steam Machine", a musical artist signed with Fervor Records

See also
 Index of steam energy articles